Jasmin Geljo (born September 18, 1959) is a Bosnian-Canadian actor. He is best known for his roles in Cube Zero, as Ryjkin, and in the films Land of the Dead, Assault on Precinct 13 and The Sentinel. He also appears in Schitt's Creek (2015–2020) as Ivan.

Before the Bosnian War, Geljo was mostly known for his roles as Mima Šiš and Roki Mokroguz in the Yugoslav and Bosnian cult show Audicija (Audition).

Early work
Geljo was born in Sarajevo, PR Bosnia and Herzegovina, FPR Yugoslavia. He graduated acting at the Academy of Performing Arts in Sarajevo. At only eleven years of age, he made his first film called Boy with a Violin. After completing high school, he studied drama at the University of Sarajevo's Academy of Dramatic Arts, taught by professor Boro Stjepanović and world-renowned director Emir Kusturica.

By the second year of the four-year-long academic program, Geljo started getting principal roles in film, television, and theatre in the former Yugoslavia. In 1985, he played a role in Kusturica's film When Father Was Away on Business, which received a Golden Palm for best film of the year at the Cannes Film Festival. After graduating from the Academy, he appeared in numerous productions all over former Yugoslavia.

Geljo is also known for his roles as Mima Šiš and Roki Mokroguz in the famous Yugoslav and Bosnian show Audicija.

Career in Canada
Geljo relocated to Toronto, Ontario, Canada in 1993 and continued his acting. He has since expanded his repertoire to include film production as well.

In 2016, Geljo received a Canadian Screen Award nomination for Best Actor at the 4th Canadian Screen Awards, for his performance in the film The Waiting Room.

Filmography

Film
 Noć strijepnje (1982)
 Pismo – Glava (1983)
 Samek (1983)
 Provincija u pozadini (1984)
 Veliki talenat (1984)
 When Father Was Away on Business (1985)
 Audicija (1985) as Mima Šiš
 Azra (1988) as Ibro
 Čovjek koji je znao gdje je sjever a gdje jug (1989) as Ivan
 Hajde da se volimo 2 (1989) as Vatrogasac 1
 Sa 204-272 (1991) as Otas
 Nova Audicija (1991) as Mima Šiš and Roki Mokroguz
 Voajer (1992)
 Peacekeepers (1997) as Cowboy
 After Alice (2000) as Immigrant Husband
 Beyond Borders (2003) as Truck Driver
 Cube Zero (2004) as Ryjkin
 Left Behind: World at War (2005) as Russian Officer
 Neil (2005) as Davor
 Land of the Dead (2005) as Tambourine Man
 Assault on Precinct 13 (2005) as Marko
 Citizen Duane (2006) as Barber
 The Battery-Powered Duckling (2006) as The Guard
 Skinwalkers (2006) as Cabin Person #1
 The Sentinel (2006) as Assassin
 Stir of Echoes: The Homecoming (2007) as Maintenance Man
 Snijeg (2008) as Miro
 Gangster Exchange (2009) as Gogo Wolf
 The Shrine (2010) as Purple Cloaked Man #2
 The Waiting Room (2015)
 Scaffold (2017)
 Violation (2020) as Ivan
 The White Fortress (2021)
 The Last Mark (2022) as Oslo

Television
 Brisani prostor (1985) as Bili (3 episodes)
 ZOS: Zone of Separation (2009) as Vilko the Red (3 episodes)
 Schitt's Creek (2015–2020) as Ivan
 Air Emergencies; Locomotiv hockey team disaster (2013) as first officer Igor Javielov (1 episode)
 Titans (2021) as Conductor (1 episode)
 The Boys (2022) as "Big Nina" Oligarch (1 episode)

References

External links
 

Living people
1959 births
Bosnia and Herzegovina male film actors
Bosnia and Herzegovina male television actors
Bosnia and Herzegovina emigrants to Canada
Male actors from Sarajevo